Michael Burgess,  (July 22, 1945 – September 28, 2015) was a Canadian actor and tenor singer, best known for his portrayal of Jean Valjean in the Toronto production of Les Misérables and was the former anthem singer of the Toronto Maple Leafs.

Early life and career 
Burgess was born in Regina, Saskatchewan; his early musical training included education at Toronto's St. Michael's Choir School. He studied at the University of Ottawa.

Burgess appeared as one of the 17 Jean Valjeans at the end of the Les Miserables 10th Anniversary Concert. His other major performances include Man of La Mancha, Blood Brothers, and starring roles throughout Canada and the United States.

He is also known in Canada for his frequent vocal performances of national anthems; he was the first individual to sing "O Canada" at the baseball World Series, in Atlanta in 1992. In 2013, he was made a Member of the Order of Ontario.

Personal life and death
He married fellow Les Misérables performer Susan Gilmour on October 8, 1994. He also has a son Jesse Burgess from a previous relationship.

Burgess died in a hospice in Toronto on September 28, 2015, from skin cancer. He was 70.

References

External links

 Michael Burgess article at The Canadian Encyclopedia

1945 births
2015 deaths
Canadian male singers
Canadian pop singers
Canadian male stage actors
Canadian male television actors
Canadian people of Scottish descent
Members of the Order of Ontario
Musicians from Regina, Saskatchewan
Male actors from Regina, Saskatchewan
Deaths from cancer in Ontario